Lucasium is a genus of lizards, sometimes called ground geckos, in the family Diplodactylidae. The genus is endemic to Australia, and it includes 14 species.

Species
The following species are recognized as being valid:
Lucasium alboguttatum  – white-spotted ground gecko
Lucasium bungabinna 
Lucasium byrnei  – Byrne's gecko, gibber gecko
Lucasium damaeum  – beaded gecko
Lucasium immaculatum  – pale-striped ground gecko
Lucasium iris  – Gilbert ground gecko
Lucasium maini  – Main's ground gecko
Lucasium microplax 
Lucasium occultum  – Alligator Rivers gecko
Lucasium squarrosum  – mottled ground gecko
Lucasium steindachneri  – box-patterned gecko, Steindachner's gecko
Lucasium stenodactylum  – crowned gecko, pale-snouted ground gecko, 
Lucasium wombeyi  – Pilbara ground gecko
Lucasium woodwardi  - Pilbara ground gecko
Nota bene: A binomial authority in parentheses indicates that the species was originally described in a genus other than Lucasium.

Captivity
Both the beaded gecko and the box-patterned gecko can be kept as pets although a permit is required to keep them.

References

Further reading
Wermuth, Heinz (1965). "Liste der rezenten Amphibien und Reptilien, Gekkonidae, Pygopodidae, Xantusiidae ". Das Tierreich 80: 1–246. (Lucasium, new genus). (in German).

 
Lizard genera
Geckos of Australia
Taxa named by Heinz Wermuth